is a Japanese rower. She competed in the women's lightweight double sculls event at the 2004 Summer Olympics.

References

1975 births
Living people
Japanese female rowers
Olympic rowers of Japan
Rowers at the 2004 Summer Olympics
Sportspeople from Shizuoka Prefecture
Asian Games medalists in rowing
Rowers at the 2002 Asian Games
Asian Games bronze medalists for Japan
Medalists at the 2002 Asian Games
21st-century Japanese women